The Royal Scam is the fifth studio album by American rock band Steely Dan. It was produced by Gary Katz and was originally released by ABC Records in 1976. The Royal Scam features more prominent guitar work than the prior Steely Dan album, Katy Lied, which had been the first without founding guitarist Jeff Baxter. Guitarists on the recording include Walter Becker, Denny Dias, Larry Carlton, Elliott Randall and Dean Parks.

"The Fez" has the distinction of being the only Steely Dan song with an additional writer credited beyond Becker and Fagen, namely keyboard player Paul Griffin. As Becker said, "There is an instrumental melody that Paul started playing in the session, and when we decided to build that melody up to a greater position, since we had some suspicion that perhaps this melody wasn't entirely Paul's invention, we decided to give him composer credit in case later some sort of scandal developed and he would take the brunt of the impact." However, Griffin claimed that Fagen already had the keyboard riff, and that he took it in a different direction. Fagen later said of Griffin, "There are some musicians who are hacks, and then there are guys like Paul who can create something so different and unique they make the record." The composition was explained as "a cheerful ode to the importance of always wearing a condom" in an August 22, 1993 Los Angeles Times article written by Chris Willman.

In common with other Steely Dan albums, The Royal Scam is littered with cryptic allusions to people and events both real and fictional. In a BBC interview in 2000, Becker and Fagen revealed that "Kid Charlemagne" is loosely based on Owsley Stanley, the notorious drug "chef" who was famous for manufacturing hallucinogenic compounds, and that "Caves of Altamira", based on a book by Hans Baumann,  is about the loss of innocence, the narrative about a visitor to the Cave of Altamira who registers his astonishment at the prehistoric drawings. It is also influenced by Plato's Cave Allegory and Keats' "Ode on a Grecian Urn".

The album went gold and peaked at number 15 on the Billboard 200. The album was re-issued by MCA Records in 1979 following the sale of the ABC Records label to MCA.

Cover
The album cover shows a man in a suit, sleeping on a radiator, and apparently dreaming of skyscraper-beast hybrids. The cover was based on a painting by Zox, which was originally created for an unreleased Van Morrison album. Designer Ed Caraeff suggested superimposing a photograph by Charlie Ganse of a sleeping vagrant. In the liner notes for the 1999 remaster of the album, Fagen and Becker claim it to be "the most hideous album cover of the seventies, bar none (excepting perhaps Can't Buy a Thrill)."

Eagles reference and beyond
In the song "Everything You Did", a lyric says, "turn up the Eagles, the neighbors are listening." Glenn Frey of the Eagles said, "Apparently Walter Becker's girlfriend loved the Eagles, and she played them all the time. I think it drove him nuts. So, the story goes that they were having a fight one day and that was the genesis of the line." Given that the two bands shared a manager (Irving Azoff) and that the Eagles proclaimed their admiration for Steely Dan, this was more friendly rivalry than feud.

Later that year in a nod back to Steely Dan for the free publicity, and inspired by Steely Dan's lyric style, the Eagles penned the lyrics, "They stab it with their steely knives but they just can't kill the beast" in their hit "Hotel California". Frey commented, "We just wanted to allude to Steely Dan rather than mentioning them outright, so 'Dan' got changed to 'knives,' which is still, you know, a penile metaphor." This comment refers to the name's claimed origin in William S. Burroughs' book Naked Lunch. Timothy B. Schmit, who sang background vocals on The Royal Scam, would later join the Eagles.

Reception

The album was not as highly rated upon its release as its predecessors with most reviewers finding that it did not show any musical progress. In contrast, the original Rolling Stone review was more positive, and ultimately the magazine gave it five stars in a later Hall of Fame review.
In 2000 it was voted number 868 in Colin Larkin's All Time Top 1000 Albums.

Singles
"Kid Charlemagne" spent three weeks on the Billboard charts, reaching a peak position of No 82 in July 1976.
"The Fez" spent five weeks on the Billboard charts and reached No 17 in October 1976.
"Haitian Divorce" spent nine weeks on the UK Singles Chart and reached No 59 in December 1976.

Track listing

Personnel

Steely Dan
 Donald Fagen – keyboards, vocals, background vocals
 Walter Becker – bass guitar, guitar

Additional musicians

 Paul Griffin – keyboards
 Don Grolnick – keyboards
 Denny Dias – guitar
 Larry Carlton – guitar
 Dean Parks – guitar
 Elliott Randall – guitar
 Jim Horn – saxophone
 Plas Johnson – saxophone
 John Klemmer – saxophone
 Chuck Findley – trumpet
 Bob Findley – horn
 Dick Hyde – horn, trombone
 Chuck Rainey – bass
 Rick Marotta – drums ("Don't Take Me Alive", "Everything You Did")
 Bernard Purdie – drums (all other tracks)
 Gary Coleman – percussion
 Victor Feldman – percussion, keyboards
 Timothy B. Schmit – background vocals
 Venetta Fields – background vocals
 Clydie King – background vocals
 Sherlie Matthews – background vocals
 Michael McDonald – background vocals

Production

 Gary Katz – producer
 Roger Nichols – engineer
 Barney Perkins – mixdown engineer
 Brian Gardner - mastering engineer
 Dinky Dawson – sound consultant
 Walter Becker – horn arrangements
 Donald Fagen – horn arrangements
 Chuck Findley – horn arrangements
 Ed Caraeff – art direction
 Zox – cover art
 Tom Nikosey – typography

Charts

Weekly charts

Year-end charts

References

External links
 Complete lyrics
 

Steely Dan albums
1976 albums
ABC Records albums
Albums produced by Gary Katz